The Cameroonian Party of Democrats (PDC) is a political party in Cameroon.

History
The PDC was initially a loose alliance of candidates, which contested the 1956 Territorial Assembly elections. It received 20.9% of the vote, winning 20 of the 70 seats.

The party was officially formed in 1958, drawing its support from the Ewondo, Bulu and Eton ethnic groups. Its vote share dropped to 10.4% in the 1960 elections, with the party reduced to twelve of the 100 seats.

The 1964 elections saw the PDC receive 6.4% of the vote in West Cameroon, failing to win a seat. It subsequently ceased to operate in the mid-1960s.

The party was resurrected when multi-party democracy was restored in the 1990s. It contested the 1992 parliamentary elections, but received only 1.8% of the vote and failed to win a seat. The 1997 elections saw it receive just 0.1% of the vote, again failing to win a seat.

References

Political parties in Cameroon
Political parties established in 1958
1958 establishments in French Cameroon